The territory of current Honduras was inhabited by two culturally distinct peoples: the Maya civilization and the Nahua. Although the Mesoamerican influence was the one that remained as the dominant influence in the territory.

Culture and achievements 

The influence of Mesoamerican cultures from the valley and southern Mexico can be observed in the archaeological sites of Yarumela, Tenampua,  and Los Naranjos during the late pre-classic period and mid classic period. We can see these influence mainly in the pyramidal structures. The largest in Honduras is the structure 101 of Yarumela, also known as "El Cerrito", which is more than 20 meters high and can be seen from almost anywhere in the valley where the site was located. Copan was also influenced from other regions and cities from the Mayan and Mesoamerican world, like Tikal and Teotihuacan.    

This last one having a big influence in the city thanks to the trade routes that extended from the Valley of Mexico to central Honduras to the Lencan region. In the northern part of the country pyramid like structures can still be seen in many mounds built by other cultures such as the Xicaque and Pcultures. After cultural encounter with Mayans, they started to adopt soon a pyramid like style of construction as seen in the archaeological sites of the valley of Sula near the city of San Pedro Sula Cortes. Other archaeological site that has these characteristics is the archaeological site of El Curruste, with many mounds that reach the six to eight meters most of them used for religious ceremonies.

Agriculture 
They were driven by the development of a varied agriculture (beans, cocoa, chili, etc.) and had large irrigation systems. In this way, they guaranteed adequate food for their populations within the Mesoamerican area of influence. In the case of the region east of the great transversal depression of Honduras and next to the Caribbean Sea, we have yam or mountain cassava crops along with hunting and fishing that characterize the Circuncaribe cultural influence. They were also growers of fruits native to the continent such as Papaya, Pineapple, Tomato and Avocado. Also playing an important role in your economy.

Arts 

They also applied techniques of great perfection in textiles and ceramics, many of which were decorated with all kinds of illustrations that represent a human or an animal. They developed an intense, complex, and varied trade of these art. Architecture also founds an important role in these cultures, the most developed in the national territory was the Mayan. In the western national territory you can find ruins of Mayan cities such as Copan and El Puente as examples of this and a number of mounds scattered throughout the territory where they were present.

Sciences 
They reached a high scientific development in mathematics and astronomy; in addition to architecture and sculpture, that employed in the construction of big cities.  In addition to engineering and sculpture, which they used in the construction of large cities, even having systems of aqueducts and drains that are still functional .1 The calendar and systems to calculate the movement of stars and planets like Venus is another of their great advances in science. The writing was also quite developed, the Mayan writing had more than two thousand different characters each with one representing a different word, element or phrase.

Economy 
The economy of these societies was in the agriculture of fruits and vegetables. There is archaeological evidence of changes and trade routes with different towns, such as those in Yarumela, which was a key area for the trade and commercial exchange of merchandise from various cultural areas. It was imported jewels from Guatemala and beans that came from Yucatán Mexico, such as cocoa. 

The cultural contact through the trade of these people went from the north of the valley of Mexico to what today comprises Nicaragua and the Caribbean. Important pieces of Jade and metals from archaeological sites in Mayan cities such as Copan Ruinas and El Puente show that they maintained absolute control of trade networks during the classical period. For the Post classic period, the Mayan culture was in decline and had lost its political-military power in Honduras, therefore the Lenca kingdoms maintained contact with some cultures until the arrival of the conquerors.

Religion 

Most of the religions of the natives belonging to what today comprises the Honduran territory were polytheistic in nature. Many of the deities that various peoples worshiped were hierarchical. In the Mayan area of the country, religion was not far from that of the rest of the indigenous people of this culture, since the same rites were practiced and the same deities were worshiped as in all the area that this culture understood. 

The Lenca autochthonous religion was highly influenced by Nahualism, also having hierarchically organized deities. Some of its most important deities were Itanipuca (great earth mother), Ilanguipuca (great sky father), Icelaca (lord of seasons) among others. As for the peoples of circum-Caribbean origin that inhabit the country, each one had their own religion with their own belief system and deities. Some archaeological remains show that these peoples also had representations of their gods either in rock carvings or paintings.

Toltec cultures 
In the northwestern section of Honduras, villages with Tolteca influences predominated, between them the following:
 The Náhuatl: lived in the valley of Naco and Trujillo;
 The Ch'orti' people were located in Cortés, Copán and Ocotepeque
 The Lencas, that extended by the departments of Santa Bárbara, Lempira, Intibucá, La Paz, Comayagua, Francisco Morazán and Valley and part of what today comprises the territory of El Salvador.

Nomadic and semi-nomadic cultures 
The rest of the Honduran territory is inhabited by villages from the south of the continent, with a nomadic and semi-nomadic cultures, governed by relations of communal production.

Between these villages found the following:
 Xicaques,
 Pech people,
  / Mayangna (Sumo)
 and Miskito people.
Into this group, falls the majority of the population of the country.

Lencas 

The largest population is the Lencas who, when the Spanish arrived, were the most widespread and organised of the groups of the country.

They lived in populations of considerable size, with an average of 350 houses and much more of 500 people. Although scientific controversies exist on the descendants and origin of the Lencas, of agreement to Rodolfo Baron Castro, are the direct rests heirs of the Mayas, that did not follow the exodus that gave end to the Ancient Empire. At the arrival of the Spaniards, they were  established in the territory that today comprises the Republics of El Salvador and Honduras." However, other theories maintain that this group is much older, possibly being a descendant of Olemecs, thanks to the archaeological evidence of Los Naranjois, which were confirmed to be built by ancestors of this culture.

The Maya area consists of what in our days are the countries of Honduras, Guatemala, El Salvador and Mexico.

The Maya flowered in these countries in the first fifteen centuries of the Christian era. Causes unknown to this day, caused the abandonment and destruction of Copán and other Mayan cities, that in the period of the Spanish conquest were no longer more than ruins. Hunger, plagues, internal wars have been proposed as causes of the abandonment.

End of Pre-Hispanic Honduras 
This period of national history came to an end in 1524. After the fall of the Aztec empire in 1521 with the victory of Hernán Cortés and his allies, Gil González Dávila became the first Spaniard to arrive in Honduras for conquest purposes. Which had to face a huge, violent and well organized indigenous resistance. 

Then Cortes, moved by the reports he had received on the great wealth found in those territories, gave authorization to send two expeditions, one for more and the other for land. The first was entrusted to Pedro de Alvarado and the second to Cristóbal de Olid, the latter, betrayed him. For this reason, Cortés left Mexico to capture and execute him for his actions. During the two years of the conqueror's stay, he introduced the cattle and fruits from Spain. He founded the town of Natividad near Puerto Horses and appointed Hernando de Saavedra, Governor of Honduras and left instructions to treat the indigenous people well, allowing some of them to keep their lands and properties.

See also 
 History of Honduras
 Ethnicity in Honduras
 Chortís
 Sumu
 Pech
 Languages of Honduras
 Spanish conquest of Honduras

References 

Honduras
Honduran culture
Ethnic groups in Honduras
History of Honduras
Languages of Honduras
Indigenous peoples in Honduras